Filer may refer to:

Places 
 Filer, Idaho
 Filer, Missouri
 Filer Charter Township, Michigan
 Filer City, Michigan
 Filer Haven, a cove on Signy Island, Antarctica
 Filer Hill, a mountain near east of Rootville, New York

Other
 Filer (surname)
Network-attached storage (NAS), device, a specialized device that acts as a file server
 NetApp filer, a computer storage product

See also
 Filler (disambiguation)
 Filer and Stowell